Ray Abrams (April 19, 1906 — June 4, 1981) was an American animator and director. Abrams worked on several major animations during the 1930s. He began his career as an animator at the Metro-Goldwyn-Mayer cartoon studio, Walter Lantz Productions and Hanna-Barbera.

Abrams was born in 1906 and was raised on a property in Salt Lake City, Utah. Abrams began his career at Walt Disney Productions in the late 1920s where he worked as an animator for the Alice Comedies and Oswald The Lucky Rabbit, then migrating to Charles Mintz's studio along with most of Disney's former staff before he arrived at Walter Lantz Productions in 1930. After several years he subsequently moved to the Metro-Goldwyn-Mayer cartoon studio in 1937 and mainly worked on shorts under the direction of Tex Avery. In 1950 he went back to Lantz and in 1965 he moved to Hanna-Barbera he remained there until his death in 1981

Between 1930 and 1955, he worked in the studio of Walter Lantz Productions, mainly for "Woody Woodpecker" and "Chilly Willy".

Filmography 
Abrams is considered to work on some of the greatest cartoons of the Golden Age of American Animation:
 The Woody Woodpecker Show (Animator–1957)
 Blitz Wolf (animator–1942)
 King-Size Canary (animator–1947)
 The Stone Age (animator–1931)

Death 
At the age of 75 he died in Los Angeles, California in 1981.

References

External links  
 

Animators from Utah
American animated film directors
1906 births
1981 deaths
Walter Lantz Productions people
Hanna-Barbera people
Metro-Goldwyn-Mayer cartoon studio people
Walt Disney Animation Studios people